The Leases Act 1449 (c. 6) is an Act of the Parliament of Scotland.

It sets forth obligations between tenants and landlords. One such example is that is protects tenants from transfers by their landlord; whether that is a real right, or a fully fledged right is disputed.

References

External links
Leases Act 1449. legislation.gov.uk.

Acts of the Parliament of Scotland
1440s in law
1449 in Scotland
Medieval Scots law
Scottish society in the Middle Ages
Scots property law
Landlord–tenant law